Nosratabad-e Behraz (also Romanized as Noşratābād-e Behrāz, Noşratābād Bahraz, and Noşratābād-e Bohrāz; also known as Bohrāz and Noşratābād) is a village in Seyyed Jamal ol Din Rural District, in the Central District of Asadabad County, Hamadan Province, Iran. At the 2006 census, its population was 915, in 240 families.

References 

Populated places in Asadabad County